"Untold Stories" is a song written by Tim O'Brien, and recorded by American country music artist Kathy Mattea.  It was released in July 1988 as the third single from the album Untasted Honey.  The song reached #4 on the Billboard Hot Country Singles & Tracks chart.

Charts

Weekly charts

Year-end charts

References

1988 singles
Kathy Mattea songs
Song recordings produced by Allen Reynolds
Mercury Records singles
1987 songs